Agnes Sofia Shine Alexiusson (born 19 April 1996) is a Swedish boxer. She competed in the women's lightweight event at the 2020 Summer Olympics.

References

External links
 

1996 births
Living people
Swedish women boxers
Olympic boxers of Sweden
Boxers at the 2020 Summer Olympics
Boxers at the 2014 Summer Youth Olympics
Boxers at the 2015 European Games
Boxers at the 2019 European Games
European Games medalists in boxing
European Games bronze medalists for Sweden
Sportspeople from Stockholm
21st-century Swedish women